The Charles V European Award is awarded by the  European Academy of Yuste Foundation. The award is delivered to those individuals, organisations, projects or initiatives who "with their effort and dedication, have contributed to the general understanding and appreciation of the cultural, scientific values, historians of Europe, as well as the process of unification of the European Community".

History
The award bears the name of Charles V of Habsburg. Charles was crowned emperor of the Holy Roman Empire, in the Aachen palatine chapel, the same place where previously Charlemagne had been crowned. Charles, born in Ghent (Flanders, Belgium) and of Spanish and German ancestors, ruled the Netherlands, Spain, Germany and other nations of Central Europe in the 16th century. He was a polyglot (speaking French, Dutch, Latin, Spanish, Italian, and German) and a believer in the medieval idea of a united Christian Europe.
He spent his last days suffering gout in the Monastery of Yuste, in the Spanish region of Extremadura, where he died in 1558.

This award was established in 1995, to highlight the European spirit of Spain, similarly to other European prizes such as the Charlemagne Prize, awarded by the city of Aachen since 1950, and was presented to King Juan Carlos I in 1982.

Recipients
 1995.  Jacques Delors
 1998.  Wilfried Martens
 2000.  Felipe González Márquez
 2002.  Mikhail Gorbachev
 2004.  Jorge Sampaio
 2006.  Helmut Kohl
 2008.  Simone Veil
 2011.  Javier Solana Madariaga
 2013.  Durao Barroso
 2016.  Sofia Corradi
 2017.  Marcelino Oreja Aguirre
 2018.  Antonio Tajani
 2019.  Cultural Route of the Council of Europe
 2021.  Angela Merkel

By country 
  Spain : 3
  France,  Portugal,  Italy,  Germany : 2
  Belgium,  Russia,  Council of Europe   : 1

External links 
  Yuste Foundation

Notes

European culture
European awards